Arvind (from  ) is a common Indian masculine name meaning lotus. The name is of Hindu origin. Its variants include Aravind, Aravinda, Aravindan, and Aurobindo.

Meaning 
 means sun in the Sanskrit language. In particular, the word may refer to the lotus flower, on which the Hindu goddess of wealth and prosperity – Lakshmi – sits. It could also refer to the Sanskrit term  (meaning the "lotus eyed one"), the 347th name used to describe the Hindu god Vishnu in the Vishnu Sahasranama.

Notable people 
 Arvind Kejriwal, Indian politician and former bureaucrat
 Arvind Khanna, Indian politician and businessman
 Arvind Panagariya, Indian-American economist, professor of economics at Columbia University
 Arvind Pandey, Indian politician
 Arvind (computer scientist), Indian-American professor of Computer Science and Engineering at MIT
 Arvind Parmar, British tennis player
 Arvind Sawant, Indian politician
 Arvind Singh Mewar, Indian businessman, Maharana of Udaipur (Mewar)
 Arvind Swamy, Indian film actor
 Arvind Kumar (disambiguation), several people

Aravind
 Aravind Akash, Indian actor
 Aravind Adiga, Indian journalist and author
 Aravind L. Iyer, Indian evolutionary biologist

Aravinda
 Aravinda de Silva, Sri Lankan cricketer
 Aravinda Akroyd Ghose, better known as Sri Aurobindo, Indian philosopher
 Aravinda Chakravarti, American geneticist

Other variants
 Arabinda Muduli, Indian Odia musician, singer and lyricist
Arabinda Dhali, politician from Odisha
Aravindan Neelakandan, Indian writer

 Chithambaram Aravindh, Indian chess grandmaster

 Sri Aurobindo, Indian nationalist, philosopher, yogi and poet from Bengal

References

See also 
 
 

Indian masculine given names